Anna Camilla Elisabeth Lundén (born 5 May 1967) is a Swedish actress. She has appeared in more than 20 films and television shows since 1987.

Selected filmography
 Stockholmsnatt (1987)
 Spring of Joy (1993)

References

External links

1967 births
Living people
20th-century Swedish actresses
21st-century Swedish actresses
Swedish film actresses
Swedish television actresses
Actresses from Stockholm